Patrick Griffin was a member of the Wisconsin State Assembly during the 1876 session. Other positions he held include Chairman (similar to Mayor) of Portland, Dodge County, Wisconsin in 1875. He was a Democrat. Griffin was born on March 14, 1841, in County Clare, Ireland.

References

Politicians from County Clare
Irish emigrants to the United States (before 1923)
People from Portland, Dodge County, Wisconsin
Mayors of places in Wisconsin
1841 births
Year of death missing
Democratic Party members of the Wisconsin State Assembly